This is a list of Members of Parliament (MPs) elected in the 1892 general election, held over several days from 4 July to 26 July 1892.



By-elections 

8 February 1893: County Cork North East - Michael Davitt (Irish National Federation) replacing William O'Brien (Irish National Federation) who had been elected for two seats and chose to sit for Cork City

17 February 1893: Meath South - Jeremiah Jordan (Irish National Federation) replacing Patrick Fullam (Irish National Federation) who was unseated on petition

21 February 1893: Meath North - James Gibney (Irish National Federation) replacing Michael Davitt (Irish National Federation) who was unseated on petition

27 June 1895: Cork City - J. F. X. O'Brien (Irish National Federation) replacing William O'Brien (Irish National Federation) who had resigned his seat

Sources 
Whitaker's Almanack 1893

See also
List of parliaments of the United Kingdom
1892 United Kingdom general election

1892
 List
UK MPs
1892 United Kingdom general election